Greens Siding railway station was a station to the east of Clifford, Herefordshire, England. The station was opened in 1903, closed to passengers in 1941 and closed completely in 1950.

References

Further reading

Disused railway stations in Herefordshire
Railway stations in Great Britain opened in 1903
Railway stations in Great Britain closed in 1950
Former Great Western Railway stations